Streets is an Australian ice-cream brand owned by the British multinational company Unilever. Some products are made in China and shipped to Australia and New Zealand. It is part of Unilever's ice cream brand Heartbrand. The company is in a long-term contract with dairy company Dairy Farmers.

Founding and history
Streets was founded in Corrimal, New South Wales, in the 1930s by Edwin "Ted" Street and his wife Daisy. He set up a distribution depot at Bexley and then a factory where products were manufactured in the Sydney suburb of Turrella until 1996, when production moved to a new facility in Minto. Today most cream-based products are produced at Minto, while water-based products are imported from China.

Streets introduced the Paddle Pop in 1953, and sold over ninety million units by century's end. It is per capita the world's best selling ice cream.

In 2017 Unilever applied to the Fair Work Commission to terminate the current enterprise agreement on wages and conditions and return factory workers to award conditions. The Australian Manufacturing Workers Union, which represents the workers, warned that they face a pay cut of up to 46 per cent. The union called on Australians to boycott Streets products in protest. A settlement was negotiated in November 2017.

Corporate logo 
Streets shares the Heartbrand logo with Wall's, HB Ice Cream, Good Humor, GB Glace, Selecta, Kibon and Algida—used in the United Kingdom, Ireland, the United States, Canada, Sweden, Philippines, Brazil and Argentina, and Italy respectively. All brands are owned by Unilever.

Brands / Products

The following are some of the brands/products sold under the Streets name.
 Bubble O' Bill
 Calippo
 Cornetto
 Golden Gaytime (Australia) or Cookie Crumble (NZ)
 Magnum
 Paddle Pop
 Viennetta

See also
 List of ice cream brands

References

Australian brands
Ice cream brands
Dairy products companies of Australia
Australian subsidiaries of foreign companies
Unilever brands